Nicolas Elias Mendoza Daza, also known as Colacho Mendoza (April 15, 1936 – September 27, 2003) was a Colombian Vallenato accordion player and was crowned king of accordion players on many occasions in the Vallenato Legend Festival. He was born in a small village called Sabanas de Manuela in the municipality of Barrancas, La Guajira Department, in northern Colombia.

Biography

Early years
Mendoza was born April 15, 1936 in the small village of Sabanas de Manuela, located in the Municipality of Barrancas in the northern La Guajira Department. He was the son of Andrés Mendoza and Juana Daza, whom were the first to encourage him to learn music.

Accordion player
He was crowned King of the Vallenato Legend Festival in 1969. In 1987 he participated in the King of Kings competition in the Vallenato Legend Festival, an event in which only previous kings can participate, and won, defeating Alejo Duran. He played with prominent vallenato singers such as Alfonso Zuleta, Jorge Oñate, Diomedes Díaz, Silvio Britto and Ivo Luis Díaz.

External links
Colombia.com biography (Spanish)
La Vallenata Radio Station Lavallenata.com
Vallenato Legend Festival (Spanish)

1936 births
2003 deaths
People from La Guajira Department
Colombian accordionists
Vallenato musicians